Windfern High School is a public secondary school located in unincorporated Harris County, Texas, United States.

Windfern High School, often referred to as The Lighthouse, is a campus of choice in the Cypress-Fairbanks Independent School District. Windfern's main campus focus is graduation leading to post-high school education and lifelong learning.

History
The school opened in August 1995.

Classes
The main difference in classes from a regular Cypress-Fairbanks Independent School District high school campus is the class size as well as the unique contributions of the staff who believe every young person deserves more than one second chance. Classes at Windfern have an average of less than ten students per class with some classes having slightly more, and some having significantly less.  This results in a highly satisfying and productive class room dynamic which results in high personal and academic growth.

Classes at Windfern are offered in two-hour blocks, which is twice the length of a regular class at another Cypress-Fairbanks Independent School District high school. With this, the typical year-long (August–May) classes that are taken at other high schools are taken in one regular (August–December, January–May) semester at Windfern. The semesters at Windfern typically run from August–October and October–December, for the first "long semester." In the second part of the year, another two semesters are completed in the January–May period with the semester break coming in March. There is no actual time off between semesters (except for the two-week Holiday break in December).

The unique structure of classes at Windfern allows a student who would have not graduated on time to "catch up" and actually graduate four years after they entered high school, or in other cases, earlier than expected (3 to 3.5 years).

Students
Windfern students generally fall between the ages of 17-21, and take anywhere from one to five classes per semester. A student typically transfers to Windfern because certain challenges have delayed them in the pursuit of the traditional path to graduation. The reasons for these delays are widely varied and are truly unique to each student, therefore, an application process is employed to select which students would most benefit.

A standard full Windfern course load is three two-hour classes.. It is also not uncommon for a student to take only the one or two classes needed to graduate. Some students may arrive in the afternoon for a class, or may just come in the mornings. There is not a fixed regimen to which all students must adhere.

Campus
Windfern is located in the former Cypress-Fairbanks Independent School District Administration Building. Students utilize the parking lot of Pridgeon Stadium located directly adjacent to the school. Windfern is an open campus, meaning students are welcome to leave at certain times of the day. Classes start at 7:15 am and last until 4:45 pm. The majority of students, however, are in class between the hours of 8:10 and 2:30. Students are allowed one hour to eat lunch, which is usually eaten off campus because the former administration building offers limited food facilities.

Graduation
Windfern holds two graduations per year. One in December, for the students completing all of their coursework in the fall semesters, and another in June for students finishing in the spring semesters. The staff at Windfern have recognized that there are no graduation speakers with a better message than the actual graduates who must audition for a spot on stage.  Usually the top three speakers are chosen by a panel which consists of the campus administration and other staff.

Feeder Patterns
Windfern is not fed by any specific middle or elementary schools because one must go through the application process before being accepted as a student. Windfern is a service campus for all of the other traditional, large campuses in the district.

Controversy
In 2017, Windfern's principal expelled a student for refusing to stand during the Pledge of Allegiance. The student said that she did it because of "police brutality" and "Donald Trump being President."  After a television station covered the story, the administration reversed its decision.

References

External links
Windfern High School Home Page
 and schools.cy-fair.isd.tenet.edu/windfern/index.htm
More Information About Windfern (PDF)

Cypress-Fairbanks Independent School District high schools
Educational institutions established in 1995
1995 establishments in Texas